Dewayne White (born October 19, 1979) is a former American defensive end. He entered the league as the Tampa Bay Buccaneers top overall selection in the 2003 NFL Draft. Tied a team record by recording at least half-a-sack in six consecutive games in 2004. During the end of 2005 season he gained notoriety when he blocked a crucial field goal against the Atlanta Falcons, and then scored his first NFL touchdown the following week on a sack and fumble return against the New Orleans Saints. Dewayne has 4 children in total, 3 daughters and one son. On March 3, 2007, White signed a 5-year, $29 million contract with the Lions. The Lions released him to free agency on March 8, 2010.

References

1979 births
American football defensive ends
Living people
Louisville Cardinals football players
Tampa Bay Buccaneers players
Detroit Lions players
Players of American football from Alabama
People from Autauga County, Alabama
Omaha Nighthawks players